Ramón Moreno Bustos (Zaragoza, Spain, 26 May 1966) is a Spanish right-wing politician who belongs to the People's Party (PP).

Married with one daughter he gained a degree in Business Law. He entered politics at the 1995 regional election when he was elected to the Aragonese Corts, the legislature of the Spanish region of Aragon. However he resigned one year later when he was elected to the Spanish Congress of Deputies representing Zaragoza Province. He was re-elected in the three subsequent elections in 2000, 2004 and 2008. On the latter occasion he was the third placed candidate on the PP list.

References

External links
Biography at Spanish Congress website
Personal blog

1966 births
Living people
People from Zaragoza
Members of the 6th Congress of Deputies (Spain)
Members of the 7th Congress of Deputies (Spain)
Members of the 8th Congress of Deputies (Spain)
Members of the 9th Congress of Deputies (Spain)
People's Party (Spain) politicians
Members of the Cortes of Aragon
Members of the 12th Congress of Deputies (Spain)